Rezső Ignác Boldizsár "Rudolf" Bauer (2 January 1879 in Budapest – 9 November 1932 in Sósér, now part of the village Dunatetétlen) was a Hungarian athlete and the winner of the gold medal in the men's discus throw at the 1900 Summer Olympics. He won with 36.04 metres, a new Olympic record.

References

External links

1879 births
1932 deaths
Athletes from Budapest
Hungarian male discus throwers
Olympic athletes of Hungary
Athletes (track and field) at the 1900 Summer Olympics
Olympic gold medalists for Hungary
Medalists at the 1900 Summer Olympics
Olympic gold medalists in athletics (track and field)